Elena Benarroch is a Moroccan-Spanish fashion designer born in Tangier in 1955 within a Moroccan Jewish family. She opened a furrier's in Madrid in 1979 and has won many awards in Spain.

References

External links
Elenabenarroch.es: Elena Benarroch website

Spanish fashion designers
Spanish women fashion designers
Moroccan fashion designers
1955 births
Living people
Jewish fashion designers
Moroccan emigrants to Spain
20th-century Moroccan Jews
People from Tangier
Spanish Jews
Spanish people of Moroccan-Jewish descent